The Grand Imperial Hotel is a hotel in Kampala, the capital and largest city of Uganda.

The Grand Imperial was one of the first hotels to be built in colonial Uganda in the early 20th century. It has 103 guest rooms, a swimming pool, two restaurants, two bars, a shopping arcade, and a gymnasium.

The hotel is located on Speke Road, on Nakasero Hill, in the heart of Kampala's central business district. Adjacent landmarks include the East African Development Bank, the Bank of Uganda, the Kampala Sheraton Hotel, and the Ugandan headquarters of Standard Chartered Bank.

The hotel is a member of the Imperial Hotels Group, which has three hotels in Kampala and three in Entebbe.

References

External links
 Hotel Homepage
Overview at Hotelsinuganda.com

Hotels in Kampala
Hotel buildings completed in 1920
Hotels established in 1920